Chovoli is a community in the municipal unit of Paion in southern Achaea, Greece. In 2011 its population was 85.  The community includes two villages, Ano Chovoli and Kato Chovoli.

References

Populated places in Achaea